This entry is a list of permanent planetariums across the world, including manufacturers. In addition, many mobile planetariums exist, touring venues such as schools.

Permanent planetariums
Planetariums are ordered by continent and then by country in alphabetical order. The planetariums are listed in the following format: name, city. The International Planetarium Society has a much more complete list at its website.

Africa

Algeria
 Complexe Culturel Abdelwahab Salim, Tipaza
 Planetarium de Ghardaia, Ghardaia

Egypt
 Arab Academy for Science and Technology Planetarium, Alexandria
 The Child Museum, Cairo
 Planetarium Science Center, Alexandria
 Suez Discovery & Science Center, Suez

Ghana
 Ghana Planetarium, Accra

South Africa
 Iziko Planetarium at the Iziko South African Museum, Cape Town
 Johannesburg Planetarium at University of the Witwatersrand, Johannesburg
 Sutherland Planetarium

Tunisia
 Planetarium of Tunis Science City, Tunis

Asia

Bangladesh
 Bangabandhu Sheikh Mujibur Rahman Novo Theatre, Dhaka
 Bangabandhu Sheikh Mujibur Rahman Novo Theatre, Rajshahi (Under Construction)
 Bangabandhu Sheikh Mujibur Rahman Novo Theatre, Khulna (Proposed)
 Bangabandhu Sheikh Mujibur Rahman Novo Theatre, Barishal (Proposed)
 Bangabandhu Sheikh Mujibur Rahman Novo Theatre, Rangpur (Proposed)

China
 Beijing Planetarium, Beijing
 Hong Kong Space Museum, Tsim Sha Tsui, Hong Kong
 Macao Science Center, Macao
 Shanghai Astronomy Museum, Shanghai

India

Indonesia
 Jagad Raya Planetarium, Tenggarong
 Jakarta Planetarium, Jakarta
 Loka Jala Crana Planetarium, Surabaya

Israel
 Eretz Israel Museum Planetarium, Tel Aviv
 Givatayim Observatory, Givatayim
 Wise Observatory, Mitzpe Ramon

Japan

Kuwait
 Kuwait Planetarium

Kazakhstan
 Aktobe Planetarium

Malaysia
 Melaka Planetarium, Malacca
 Planetarium Negara, Kuala Lumpur
 Sultan Iskandar Planetarium, Sarawak

Pakistan
 PIA Institute of Planetaria, Astronomy & Cosmology (PIA-IPAC), Karachi
 PIA Institute of Planetaria, Astronomy & Cosmology (PIA-IPAC), Lahore
 PIA Institute of Planetaria, Astronomy & Cosmology (PIA-IPAC), Peshawar

Philippines
 National Museum Planetarium, Manila
 PAGASA Planetarium, Quezon City

South Korea
 Gwacheon National Science Museum Planetarium, Gwacheon
 National Science Museum, Daejeon
 Eunpyung Planetarium, Seoul National Science Museum, Seoul

Sri Lanka
 Sri Lanka Planetarium, Colombo

Taiwan
 Taipei Astronomical Museum, Taipei
 National Museum of Natural Science, Taichung
 Tainan Astronomical Education Area, Tainan

Thailand
 Bangkok Planetarium, Bangkok
 National Science Museum, Rangsit
 Rajabhat Planetarium, Phra Nakhon Si Ayutthaya
 Rangsit Science Centre for Education, Pathumthani Province
 Ban Moh Astronomy Center, Saraburi Province
 Astronomy and Science Center, Mahidol Wittayanusorn School
 Hatyai Deepsky Observation for Science, Hatyai
 Roiet Science and Cultural Centre for Education, Roi Et Province
 Nakhon Ratchasima Regional Observation For The Public, Suranaree University of Technology
 Astronomy and Science Center, Nakhon Ratchasima Province
 Regional Observation for the Public, Chachoengsao Province

Turkmenistan
 Ashgabad Planetarium, Ashgabad

Europe

Austria
 Digitales Planetarium im Naturhistorischen Museum Wien, Vienna
 Sternenturm Planetarium Judenburg, Judenburg
 , Vienna

Belarus
 Minsk Planetarium, Minsk

Belgium
 Belgian Planetarium, Brussels
 Europlanetarium Genk, Genk
 Planetarium Antwerp Zoo, Antwerp
Planètarium Olympus Mons, Mons
 Planétarium, Université de Liège, Liège
 Volkssterrenwacht vzw Beisbroek, Bruges

Bulgaria
 NAOP Gabrovo, Gabrovo
 NAOP Smolyan, Smolyan
 NAOP Varna, Varna
 NAOP Yambol, Yambol
 Planetarium of Plovdiv, Plovdiv
 Public Astronomical Observatory and Planetarium, Dimitrovgrad

Croatia
 Astronomical Centre Rijeka, Rijeka
 Nikola Tesla Technical Museum Planetarium, Zagreb

Cyprus
 The Cyprus Planetarium, T&O Nicosia

Czech Republic
 Brno Observatory and Planetarium, Brno
 Observatory and Planetarium Ceske Budejovice České Budějovice
 Observatory and Planetarium Hradec Kralove, Hradec Králové
 Observatory and Planetarium of Johanna Palisy, Poruba
 Observatory and Planetarium Plzen, Plzeň
 Observatory and Planetarium Teplice, Teplice
 Planetarium Most, Most
 Planetarium Praha, Prague

Denmark
 Orion Planetarium, Jels
 The Steno Museum, Aarhus
 Tycho Brahe Planetarium, Copenhagen

Estonia
 Planetarium in Science Centre AHHAA, Tartu
 Planetarium in Tartu Old Observatory
 Planetarium in Pernova Nature House, Pärnu
 Planetarium in Energy Discovery Centre, Tallinn

Finland
 Heureka Planetarium, Vantaa
 Kallioplanetaario, Jyväskylä
 Särkänniemi Planetarium, Tampere
 Ursa Starlab, Helsinki
 Kakslauttanen Planetarium, Saariselkä

France
 Astrorama, La Trinité, Alpes-Maritimes
 Centre d'Études et de Réalisations Astronomiques Pégoud de Belfort
 Cité de l'espace, Toulouse
 Ludiver, La Hague
 Observatoire de Strasbourg, Strasbourg
 Palais de la Découverte, Paris
 Planétarium, Nantes
 Planétarium, Rheims
 Planetarium Galilee, Montpellier
 Espace des sciences, Rennes
 Planétarium, Saint-Étienne
 Parc du Cosmos, Les Angles, Gard
 Planétarium, Vaulx-en-Velin

Germany

Greece
 Eugenides Planetarium (see also Evgenidio Foundation), Athens
 Thessaloniki Planetarium, Thessaloniki

Hungary
 Budapest Planetarium (:hu:TIT Budapesti Planetárium), Budapest
 Kecskemét Planetarium, Kecskemét

Ireland
 Inishowen Planetarium, Inishowen
 Schull Planetarium, Schull

Italy

Kosovo
 Kosovo Planetarium of Çabrat, Gjakova, Scien.-Edu. Center Cosmos & Human

Lithuania
 Planetariumas, Vilnius

Netherlands
 Artis Planetarium, Amsterdam
 Eise Eisinga Planetarium, Franeker
 Omniversum, The Hague
 Planetarium Planetron, Dwingeloo
 Planetarium Ridderkerk, Museum Johannes Postschool, Ridderkerk-Rijsoord

Norway
 Vitensenteret i Trondheim (Trondheim Science Center), Trondheim
 Nordnorsk vitensenter (Science Center of Northern Norway), Tromsø
 Saint Exupery Planetarium, Oslo
 Science Factory (Vitenfabrikken, Norway), Sandnes

Poland

Portugal
 Calouste Gulbenkian Planetarium, Lisbon
 Espinho Planetarium, Navegar Foundation, Espinho
 Planetario Coimbra, Coimbra
 Planetário do Porto, Porto

Romania
 Argeș County Museum, Pitești
 Baia Mare Astronomy Complex, Maramureș county, Baia Mare
 Bârlad Planetarium, Bârlad
 Brașov Planetarium at Zoo Brașov, Brașov, opened in 2019, the largest in the country
 Constanța Planetarium, Constanța
 Galați Planetarium, Galați
 Planetarium within the "Alexandru Ioan Cuza" University, Iași
 Planetarium within Universitatea de Vest, Timișoara
 Suceava Planetarium, Suceava

Russia

Serbia
 Belgrade Planetarium, Belgrade 
 Novi Sad Planetarium

Slovakia
 CVC Domino, Košice
 Observatory and planetarium Milan Rastislav Štefánik, Hlohovec
 Observatory and planetarium Presov, Prešov
 Observatory Vihorlat, Kolonické sedlo
 Regional Observatory and Planetarium Maximilian Hell, Žiar nad Hronom
 Slovak central observatory Hurbanovo, Hurbanovo

Spain

Sweden

Switzerland
 Planetarium at Swiss Museum of Transport, Swiss Museum of Transport, Luzern
, Schwanden near Sigriswil

Turkey

Ukraine
 Dnipro Planetarium, Dnipro
 Donetsk Planetarium, Donetsk 
 Kharkiv Planetarium, Kharkiv
 Kyiv Planetarium, Kyiv

United Kingdom

Other
 Aboard the RMS Queen Mary 2, the first planetarium at sea

North America

Canada

Alberta
 AstroDome Planetarium, High River, Alberta, travelling portable planetarium for schools
Queen Elizabeth II Planetarium, Edmonton, Alberta, closed since 1983; was expected to reopen in 2018 once renovations were completed
 TELUS Spark Science Centre, Calgary, Alberta
 Telus World of Science, Edmonton, Alberta

British Columbia
 Centre of the Universe, Victoria, British Columbia
 H. R. MacMillan Space Centre, Vancouver, British Columbia

Manitoba
 Manitoba Museum, Winnipeg, Manitoba

Ontario
 Doran Planetarium, Sudbury, Ontario
 McLaughlin Planetarium, Toronto, Ontario, closed 1995; building still extant
 Ontario Science Centre Digital Planetarium, Toronto
 Roberta Bondar Earth and Space Centre Planetarium (Seneca College Newnham Campus), Toronto, closed after 1995
 Royal Ontario Museum, Toronto, travelling portable/inflatable planetarium for schools
Science North, Greater Sudbury, Ontario
 W.J. McCallion Planetarium, Hamilton, Ontario

Quebec
 Rio Tinto Alcan Planetarium, Montreal, Quebec

Yukon
 Northern Lights Centre, Watson Lake, Yukon

Costa Rica
 Planetario Ciudad de San José, San José

Mexico

United States

Alabama
 Boyd E. Christenberry Planetarium, Homewood
 W. A. Gayle Planetarium,Montgomery
 Wernher von Braun Planetarium

Alaska
 Marie Drake Planetarium, Juneau
 Thomas Planetarium at the Anchorage Museum, Anchorage
 University of Alaska Planetarium & Visualization Theater Anchorage

Arizona
 Dorrance Planetarium at the Arizona Science Center, Phoenix
 Flandrau Science Center and Planetarium at the University of Arizona, Tucson
 Jim and Linda Lee Planetarium
 Planetarium at Mesa Community College
 The Star Barn Cave Creek, Arizona

Arkansas
 EpiSphere at the Aerospace Education Center, Little Rock

California

Colorado
 Fiske Planetarium and Science Center at the University of Colorado at Boulder, Boulder
 Gates Planetarium at Denver Museum of Nature and Science, Denver
 United States Air Force Academy Planetarium at United States Air Force Academy, Colorado Springs

Connecticut
 The Children's Museum, West Hartford
 The Discovery Museum, Bridgeport
 Leitner Family Observatory and Planetarium at Yale University, New Haven
 Treworgy Planetarium at Mystic Seaport, Mystic

District of Columbia
 Albert Einstein Planetarium, National Air and Space Museum, Smithsonian Institution
 Rock Creek Park Planetarium, Rock Creek Park Nature Center

Florida

Georgia
 Jim Cherry Memorial Planetarium at the Fernbank Science Center, Atlanta
 Mark Smith Planetarium at the Museum of Arts and Sciences, Macon
 Omnisphere Theater, Coca-Cola Challenger Space Science Center, Columbus State University, Columbus
 Rollins Planetarium at Young Harris College, Young Harris
 Tellus Planetarium at Tellus: Northwest Georgia Science Museum, Cartersville
 Wetherbee Planetarium at Thronateeska Heritage Center, Albany

Guam
 University of Guam Planetarium at the University of Guam, Agana

Hawaii
 Hōkūlani Imaginarium, Windward Community College, Kāne‘ohe, Hawai‘i
 ʻImiloa Astronomy Center, Hilo
 Jhamandas Watumull Planetarium at the Bernice P. Bishop Museum, Honolulu

Idaho
 Capital High School, Boise

Illinois
 Adler Planetarium, Chicago
 Cernan Earth and Space Center, Triton College, River Grove
 Discovery Center Museum, Rockford
 Illinois State University Planetarium, Normal
 Lakeview Museum planetarium, Peoria (closed 2012)
 Peoria Riverfront Museum, Peoria
 Staerkel Planetarium, Parkland College, Champaign
 Strickler Planetarium at Olivet Nazarene University, Bourbonnais
 Waubonsie Valley High School planetarium Aurora

Indiana
 Ball State University, Muncie, Indiana
 Bellmont High School, Decatur
 Carmel High School, Hamilton
 Holcomb Observatory and Planetarium at Butler University, Indianapolis
 Kennedy Academy, South Bend, St. Joseph County
 Koch Planetarium, Evansville
 Marion High School, Marion
 Northrop High School Fort Wayne, Indiana
 Pike High School, Indianapolis
 SpaceQuest Planetarium at Indianapolis Children's Museum, Indianapolis, Indiana (closed)
 Beyond Spaceship Earth at Indianapolis Children's Museum, Indianapolis, Indiana
Clifford Pierce Middle School,Merrillville, Indiana

Iowa
 Bettendorf High School, Bettendorf
 Sanford Museum and Planetarium, Cherokee, Iowa

Kansas
 Justice Planetarium at the Kansas Cosmosphere and Space Center, Hutchinson
 Peterson Planetarium at Emporia State University

Kentucky
 Gheen's Science Hall & Rauch Planetarium at the University of Louisville, Louisville
 Golden Pond Planetarium and Observatory, Golden Pond
 Hardin Planetarium at Western Kentucky University, Bowling Green
 Hummel Planetarium at Eastern Kentucky University, Richmond
 Star Theater, at Morehead State University, Morehead
 Varia Planetarium (part of East Kentucky Science Center) at Big Sandy Community and Technical College, Prestonsburg

Louisiana
 Dayna & Ronald L. Sawyer Space Dome Planetarium, Shreveport
 Irene W. Pennington Planetarium, Baton Rouge
 Nature Center at Audubon Nature Institute, New Orleans

Maine
 Francis Malcolm Science Center Planetarium at Easton, Maine, 776 Houlton Road
 Ladd Planetarium at Bates College, Lewiston, 44 Campus Avenue
 Maynard F. Jordan Planetarium at the University of Maine, Orono
 Southworth Planetarium at University of Southern Maine - Portland campus located at 70 Falmouth Street

Maryland
 Arthur Storer Planetarium, Prince Frederick, named after the first astronomer in the American colonies and the original namesake of Halley's Comet
 Davis Planetarium at the Maryland Science Center, Baltimore
 James E. Richmond Science Center and Planetarium, Charles County Public Schools, Waldorf (60' diameter, 184 seats)
 Watson-King Planetarium at Towson University
 William Brish Planetarium

Massachusetts
 Charles Hayden Planetarium at the Museum of Science, Boston
 Framingham State College Planetarium, Framingham
 George Alden Planetarium at the Ecotarium, Worcester
 Seymour Planetarium at the Springfield Science Museum, Springfield, the oldest operating planetarium in the United States

Michigan

Minnesota
 Como Planetarium, Como Park Elementary School, St. Paul
 Marshall W. Alworth Planetarium, University of Minnesota Duluth, Duluth, Minnesota
 Mayo High School, Rochester
 MSUM Planetarium, Minnesota State University Moorhead, Moorhead
 Paulucci Space Theatre, Hibbing Community College, Hibbing
 SMSU Planetarium, Southwest Minnesota State University, Marshall
 Whitney and Elizabeth MacMillan Planetarium, Bell Museum of Natural History, St. Paul

Mississippi
 Russell C. Davis Planetarium, Jackson

Missouri
 Del & Norma Robison Planetarium, Kirksville
 Gottlieb Planetarium, Kansas City
 James S. McDonnell Planetarium, St. Louis
 Rock Bridge Senior High School Planetarium, Columbia

Montana
 Taylor Planetarium at the Museum of the Rockies

Nebraska
 Mallory Kountze Planetarium (UNO), Omaha
 Martin Luther King, Jr. Planetarium, Omaha
 Ralph Mueller Planetarium, Lincoln

Nevada
 Fleischmann Planetarium & Science Center, Reno

New Hampshire
 McAuliffe-Shepard Discovery Center, Concord

New Jersey

New Mexico
 The Planetarium at the New Mexico Museum of Natural History & Science, Albuquerque

New York

North Carolina

Ohio

Oklahoma
 James E. Bertelsmeyer Planetarium at the Tulsa Air and Space Museum & Planetarium, Tulsa
 Kirkpatrick Planetarium at Science Museum Oklahoma, Oklahoma City
 Mackie Planetarium, Northern Oklahoma College

Oregon
 North Medford High School Planetarium, Medford
 Harry C. Kendall Planetarium (part of Oregon Museum of Science and Industry), Portland
 Planetarium at Chemeketa Community College, Hayesville
 Science Factory, Eugene

Pennsylvania

 Edinboro University Planetarium at Edinboro University of Pennsylvania, Edinboro, Pennsylvania

Puerto Rico
 RUM Planetarium, University of Puerto Rico at Mayagüez, Mayagüez

Rhode Island
 Roger Williams Park Museum of Natural History and Planetarium, Providence

South Carolina
 DuPont Planetarium at the University of South Carolina Aiken, Aiken
 SCSM Planetarium,  Columbia
 Stanback Planetarium,  Orangeburg
 T. C. Hooper Planetarium at the Roper Mountain Science Center, Greenville

Tennessee
 Bays Mountain Planetarium at Bays Mountain Park, Kingsport
 CyberSphere Digital Theater at the Renaissance Center, Dickson
 Sharpe Planetarium at the Pink Palace Museum and Planetarium, Memphis
 Sudekum Planetarium at Adventure Science Center, Nashville

Texas

Utah
 Clark Planetarium, Salt Lake City
 Ott Planetarium at Weber State University in Ogden – produces original content for small planetaria with an all-undergraduate production team
 Royden G. Derrick Planetarium, at Brigham Young University in Provo, Utah – shows created and run by BYU Astronomical Society
 Christa McAuliffe Space Education Center at Central Elementary in Pleasant Grove, Utah - provides planetarium shows and space simulator entertainment https://spacecenter.alpineschools.org/

Vermont
 Fairbanks Museum and Planetarium in Saint Johnsbury

Virginia

Washington

Wisconsin
 Barlow Planetarium at the University of Wisconsin–Oshkosh, Fox Cities Campus, Menasha
 Daniel F. Soref National Geographic Dome Theater and Planetarium, Milwaukee
 Horwitz-DeRemer Planetarium at Retzer Nature Center, Waukesha
 Madison Metropolitan School District (MMSD) Planetarium, Madison
 Manfred Olsen Planetarium at the University of Wisconsin-Milwaukee, Milwaukee
 Planetarium at University of Wisconsin–La Crosse, La Crosse
 Planetarium at University of Wisconsin–River Falls, River Falls

Oceania

Australia
 Science Space, Wollongong, NSW
 Melbourne, Scienceworks Museum Planetarium, Melbourne
 Queen Victoria Museum and Art Gallery, Launceston
 Scitech Planetarium, Perth
 Sir Thomas Brisbane Planetarium, Brisbane
 UNISA Planetarium, Mawson Lakes, Adelaide

New Zealand
 Sir Edmund Hillary Alpine Centre Digital Dome at The Hermitage Hotel, Aoraki Mt Cook
 Perpetual Guardian Planetarium at the Otago Museum Dunedin
 Planetarium North, Whangarei
 Space Place at Carter Observatory, Wellington
 Stardome Observatory, Auckland

South America

Argentina
 Complejo Astronómico Municipal, Rosario
 Complejo Planetario Malargüe, Malargüe
 Galileo Galilei planetarium, Buenos Aires
 Parque Astronómico la Punta

Brazil

Chile
 Planetario Chile (University of Santiago, Chile), Carl Zeiss VI, Santiago
 Planetario Mamalluca, Municipalidad de Vicuña, Región de Coquimbo
 Planetario Rapa Nui (Fundación Planetario Rapa Nui, Chile), Isla de Pascua
 Planetario Movil Tikva, Purranque, Región Los Lagos

Colombia
 Planetarium of Bogotá, Bogotá
 Planetarium of Medellín, Medellín

Ecuador
 Planetarium of Mitad del Mundo, Ciudad Mitad del Mundo-Quito
 Planetario de la Armada -Guayaquil- (INOCAR)
 Planetario Mundo Juvenil -Cuenca-
 Centro cultural Planetario -Quito- (IGM)

Uruguay
 Planetario de Montevideo "Agr. Germán Barbato", first Latin American planetarium (1955), Montevideo

Venezuela
 Planetario del Museo de los Niños de Caracas, Caracas
 Planetario Humboldt, [Zeiss] Caracas
 Planetario Fundación la Salle de Ciencias Naturales La Salle, Punta de Piedra
 Planetario Simón Bolívar (part of Complejo Científico, Cultural y Turístico), Maracaibo

Planetarium manufacturers
The list below gives the name of firms that have made more than five planetariums, with state they are located in if in the United States, otherwise, the nation.  Included are the names of the various models offered by each firm, and an approximate total number sold for each firm. The symbol D after the total indicates the firm is no longer in business or no longer making planetariums.
 Aquarian – New York City—20 D
 AsterDomus – Brazil—Portable planetaria manufacturer.
 Baader – Germany—Großplanetarium, Schulplanetarium, Planetarium 2000
 Evans & Sutherland – Utah Digistar 1, Digistar 2–30, Digistar 3—over 120, Digistar 4 – over 300, Digistar 5 – over 550
 E-Planetarium, Houston, Texas—Discovery Dome portable fulldome digital theater with mirror or fisheye projection, Go-Dome inflatable dome—more than 40 in 13 countries
 Fengfei—China—TX 6, 8, 9, 10, 11, 16–50
 Farquhar – Pennsylvania—40 D
 Galileo—Italy—S1, S III—20
 Gambato—Italy—30
 Goto—Japan—EX-3, E-5, Eros, Venus, G1014, GE, GE II, GE 6, GM-AT, GS 6, GM-15, Chronos, Helios, GR-T, M-1, S-3, Super Helios—Total is uncertain, about 400 outside Japan.  It is said the Japanese government placed an EX-3 in every elementary school in Japan.
 Ohira Tech – Japan, Megastar-7
 Hangzhou—China—20
 Jindu—China—J8, J10–15
 Portable Planetariums Home – Argentina – Over 150
 Minolta—Japan—Geministar, Infinium, MO-6, MS-8, MS-10, Series II, Cosmoleap—over 250
 MMI Corp. – Maryland—Starworlds (identical to Nova Junior) or Model 6500, 7700, 8800 (identical to Apollo Portable),
 Moscow—Russia—Eline, UP-2, UP-4—about 10
 Planetronix – Mexico—about 10
 RSA Cosmos—France—Cosmodyssee, SN 88, SN 95–20
 Science First/Starlab Yulee, Florida—manufacturers/ellers of Starlab portable planetariums and digital dtarlabs. Over 650 systems on 6 continents as of December 2010 and growing.
 Sky-Skan – New Hampshire immersive full dome installations, from architectural design and build to systems install and maintenance. Original product was SkyVision, now Definiti (runs DigitalSky 2 software). More than 180 systems installed as of 2013.
 Spitz – Pennsylvania—A, A1, A2, A3, A3P, A3P', A4, A4RPY, A5, 373, 512, B, C, Spitz Junior (actually made under license by Harmonic Reed), Nova I or Nova Junior (Harmonic Reed under license), Nova II, Nova III, STP, STS, Spitz School—over 500
 TSA – Ohio—Emmons, TSA—6 D
 Viewlex—New York—Apollo I, Apollo II, Apollo III, Apollo Portable—125 D
 XTY—China—15
 Zeiss—Germany—Mark I to VI, Universarium VII to IX, ZKP-1, ZKP-2 to ZKP-4 (Skymaster), RFP (Spacemaster), Starmaster—400
 Vratino Space Research Council  India-  Gorakhpur (UP), Kolkata (WB) .
factories in Argentina, Mexico, China and Russian Federation. Biggest portable planetarium exporter worldwide.

See also
 Amateur astronomy

References

Further reading
 Worldwide Planetarium Database

External links
Worldwide Planetariums Database (WPD)
Planetariums & Digital Dome Theatres Database
Plafinder – planetarium search engine
Loch Ness Productions Fulldome Theater Compendium (fulldome facilities)
Loch Ness Productions Dome Theater Compendium (classic facilities)